Scott Dragos (born October 28, 1975) is a former American football fullback and tight end. He played for the Chicago Bears in 2000-2001.

Early years
Dragos attended Old Rochester Regional High School, which serves the towns of Marion, Mattapoisett, and Rochester, Massachusetts.

College career
Dragos attended and played college football at the Boston College from 1994-1997.

Professional career

First stint with Patriots
After going undrafted in the 1998 NFL Draft, Dragos was signed by the New England Patriots on April 24, 1998, but was released on August 19, 1998.

New York Giants
One day later after released by the Patriots, the Giants signed Dragos on the practice squad

Chicago Bears
After released by the Giants, the Bears signed Dragos on practice squad on September 28, 1999. He was elevated to their active roster on October 10, 2000 and made his NFL debut on October 15, 2000 in a 28–16 loss to the Minnesota Vikings. Dragos Caught first career reception against the Buffalo Bills on November 12, 2000. Dragos gaining four yards … Grabbed two catches for 14 yards in win against the New England Patriots on December 10, 2000. One of Dragos' catches was against Hall of Fame cornerback Ty Law and led to one of the most iconic NFL photos of the decade. Dragos started season-finale against the Detroit Lions.

In 2001 Dragos played six games.

Second stint with Patriots
Dragos signed with the Patriots on March 12, 2002. On August 25, 2002 Dragos was released by Patriots.

Personal life
Dragos was the Executive Vice President of CBRE in September 2018.

References 

1975 births
American football fullbacks
American football tight ends
Boston College Eagles football players
Chicago Bears players
Living people
New England Patriots players
New York Giants players
Old Rochester Regional High School alumni